Noel Ashley Crichton-Browne (born 2 February 1944 at Wiluna, Western Australia) is a former member of the Australian Senate and political lobbyist.

Early life
Crichton-Browne was educated at Scotch College, Perth. Before his career in politics, he was a company manager and served as president of the Marble Bar Shire Council.

Career
After serving as the state president of the WA division of the Liberal Party from 1975 to 1979, Crichton-Browne was elected to the Senate for Western Australia in 1980 (term beginning 1 July 1981), 1983, 1984, 1987 and 1990.

He served as a Liberal Party senator from 1 July 1981 to 9 September 1995, and thereafter as an Independent after being expelled from the Liberal Party following media publicity of his inappropriate language and behaviour towards journalist Colleen Egan. His expulsion motion was initiated by WA Liberal state president David Honey, who was Crichton-Browne's protege. Crichton-Browne had helped Honey in attaining the party presidency. Honey, as party president, turned against his former mentor in response to Crichton-Browne's behaviour to Egan. Honey later became parliamentary leader of the party in 2021, and upon his election as leader, Honey brought up his role in the expulsion of Crichton-Browne as a reason why he should be party leader, who would oversee a "root and branch" analysis and restructuring of the party. Honey explained, that as the party president, he had to deal with the issue of Crichton-Browne being a power broker and his "undue influence" over the party and preselections.

Crichton-Browne retired from Parliament upon the expiry of his final term on 30 June 1996.

Fraud
In 1998, he pleaded guilty in the ACT Magistrates Court to fraudulently claiming $4,500 in taxpayer-funded expenses for two weekends spent at holiday spots with a female companion.

References 

Members of the Australian Senate for Western Australia
Living people
1944 births
People from Wiluna, Western Australia
Members of the Australian Senate
Liberal Party of Australia members of the Parliament of Australia
Independent members of the Parliament of Australia
20th-century Australian politicians